The shorter cross-country skiing event of the cross-country skiing at the 1932 Winter Olympics programme was contested of a distance of 19.7 kilometres. It was the third appearance of the event, but the only time this race was held over a distance of 19.7 kilometres. The competition was held on Wednesday, 10 February 1932. Forty-two cross-country skiers from eleven nations competed.

Medalists

Results

References

External links
Official Olympic Report
 

Men's 18 kilometre
Men's 18 kilometre cross-country skiing at the Winter Olympics